Im Ho-geun (born 1 November 1939) is a South Korean athlete. He competed in the men's shot put at the 1964 Summer Olympics.

References

1939 births
Living people
Athletes (track and field) at the 1964 Summer Olympics
South Korean male shot putters
Olympic athletes of South Korea
Place of birth missing (living people)